Tanner Pierce Banks (born October 24, 1991) is an American professional baseball pitcher for the Chicago White Sox of Major League Baseball (MLB). He was drafted by the White Sox in the 18th round of the 2014 Major League Baseball draft.

Career
Banks was drafted by the Chicago White Sox in the 18th round of the 2014 Major League Baseball draft. Banks made his professional debut with the rookie-level Arizona League White Sox and also appeared in 1 game for the Single-A Kannapolis Intimidators. In 2015, Banks split the year between Kannapolis and the rookie-level Great Falls Voyagers, logging a 5–5 record and 2.71 ERA in 22 total contests. The following year, Banks split time between Kannapolis and the High-A Winston-Salem Dash, pitching to a 12–7 record and 3.50 ERA with 116 strikeouts in 159.1 innings pitched across 27 starts. Banks played the 2017 season with Winston-Salem and the Double-A Birmingham Barons, posting a 10–11 record and 4.28 ERA with 113 strikeouts in 26 games (25 of them starts). In 2018, Banks returned to the two affiliates and recorded a 12–7 record and 2.59 ERA with 100 strikeouts in 146.0 innings of work across 23 starts.

Banks split the 2019 season between Double-A Birmingham and the Triple-A Charlotte Knights, accumulating a 6–7 record and 4.19 ERA with 88 strikeouts in 30 appearances (21 of them starts). Banks did not play in a game in 2020 due to the cancellation of the minor league season because of the COVID-19 pandemic. He spent the 2021 season with Triple-A Charlotte, logging a 4.53 ERA with 70 strikeouts in 59.2 innings pitched across 25 total appearances. Banks was invited to Spring Training for the 2022 season, and was initially reassigned to minor league camp prior to the season. However, on April 5, 2022, it was announced that Banks had made Chicago's Opening Day roster. He was formally selected to the 40-man roster on April 7. 

On April 10, Banks made his MLB debut, pitching the final two innings of a 10–1 victory of the Detroit Tigers. Banks did not allow a run and collected four strikeouts in the game. In his first season of Major League Baseball, Banks went 2–0 in 35 games with an ERA of 3.06 in 53 innings with 49 strikeouts.

References

External links

1991 births
Living people
People from Riverton, Utah
Baseball players from Utah
Major League Baseball pitchers
Chicago White Sox players
Utah Utes baseball players
Arizona League White Sox players
Kannapolis Intimidators players
Great Falls Voyagers players
Winston-Salem Dash players
Birmingham Barons players
Glendale Desert Dogs players
Charlotte Knights players